Michael Turner (19 July 1921 — 14 July 2012) was a South African-born actor who appeared in numerous British films and television series from the early 1950s. These include Callan, Emergency Ward 10, The Avengers, Z-Cars, Doctor Who (in the serial The Wheel in Space), Van der Valk, Crown Court, Dixon of Dock Green, The New Avengers, Within These Walls, Angels, Cry Freedom, Boon, Pie in the Sky and The Bill. Arguably, his most well-known role was that of tycoon business man J. Henry Pollard in the long running ITV soap Crossroads, a part he played off-and-on from 1980–1984.

External links
 
 Michael Turner at Theatricalia

South African male film actors
1921 births
2012 deaths
South African male television actors
South African expatriates in the United Kingdom